Verrières-le-Buisson is a commune in the southern suburbs of Paris, France.

The commune borders the river Bièvre.

History 
The "Villa Vedrarias", was given by Childebert I in 543 to the Abbey of Saint-Germain-des-Prés. It is the first written mention of Verrières. The current name appears during the 16th century.

Under the reign of Louis XIV, who enjoyed hunting in the Verrières forest, the term "Le Buisson" was added. This is reflected in the coat of arms, which bears an oak, along with the arms of Saint-Germain. External ornaments include two beavers (bievers in Old French) symbolizing the river Bièvre.

Population
Inhabitants of Verrières-le-Buisson are known as Verriérois.

Twin towns 
 Hövelhof in Germany, since 1971
 Swanley in the UK, since 1985
 Zinado in the Ganzourgou province in Burkina Faso, since 1998 (partnership)

Points of interest 
 Arboretum Vilmorin
 Arboretum municipal de Verrières-le-Buisson

Economy 
Kroll Ontrack has an office in the commune.

Transport 
Verrières-le-Buisson is served by no station of the Paris Métro, RER, or suburban rail network. The closest station to Verrières-le-Buisson is Massy-Verrières station, an interchange station on Paris RER line B and RER line C. This station is located in the neighboring commune of Massy,  from the town center of Verrières-le-Buisson.

Verrières is linked by the Coulée Verte cycleway to the centre of Paris, Sceaux and Massy.

Gallery

See also 

 Communes of the Essonne department

References 
 Mayors of Essonne Association

External links 

 

Communes of Essonne